Paul Vincent Nicholas Haarhuis (born 19 February 1966) is a Dutch former professional tennis player. He is a former world No. 1 doubles player, having reached a career-high singles ranking of world No. 18 in November 1995. He won six Grand Slam men's doubles titles, five with Jacco Eltingh and one with Yevgeny Kafelnikov.

Personal life
Haarhuis was born on 19 February 1966 in Eindhoven in the Netherlands. He played tennis for Armstrong State College and Florida State University. He supports PSV Eindhoven.

Tennis career
He is best known for his success in doubles with fellow countryman Jacco Eltingh, winning five Grand Slam titles together, although some would say he is best known for his 4 set loss to Jimmy Connors in the 1991 U.S. Open Quarterfinals. In his career, he won one singles title and 54 doubles titles.

He is, together with Sergi Bruguera, Richard Krajicek, Leander Paes, and Michael Stich, one of the players of the same generation with a positive head-to-head record against Pete Sampras: 3–1.

His best Grand Slam singles performance was reaching the quarterfinals of the 1991 US Open, where he defeated Eric Jelen, Andrei Chesnokov, top seed Boris Becker and Carl-Uwe Steeb, before losing to Jimmy Connors.

After retiring, he won the end-of-year Blackrock Masters Tennis tournament in the Royal Albert Hall in 2005 and 2006, beating legends such as Goran Ivanišević and John McEnroe. He completed a hat-trick of victories in the tournament in 2007, beating Frenchman Guy Forget.

Coaching
In 2014 Haarhuis succeeded Manon Bollegraf as captain of the Netherlands Fed Cup team.

ATP Tour World Championships
Doubles champion: 1993, 1998 (w/Eltingh)

Grand Slam finals

Doubles: 13 (6 titles, 7 runners-up)

Mixed doubles (1 runner-up)

Career finals

Doubles: 94 (54 titles, 40 runner-ups)

Singles: 8 (1 title, 7 runner-ups)

Performance timelines

Doubles

Singles

Senior Tour titles
2007 – defeated Jim Courier 6–1, 6–4 in The Legends Rock Dubai

References

External links
 
 
 

1966 births
Australian Open (tennis) champions
Dutch expatriates in Monaco
Dutch expatriate sportspeople in the United States
Dutch male tennis players
Florida State Seminoles men's tennis players
French Open champions
Living people
Olympic tennis players of the Netherlands
Sportspeople from Eindhoven
People from Monte Carlo
Tennis players at the 1992 Summer Olympics
Tennis players at the 1996 Summer Olympics
US Open (tennis) champions
Wimbledon champions
Grand Slam (tennis) champions in men's doubles
ATP number 1 ranked doubles tennis players
ITF World Champions